Forcipules are the modified, pincer-like, front legs of centipedes that are used to inject venom into prey. They are the only known examples of front legs acting as venom injectors.

Nomenclature 
Forcipules go by a variety of names in both scientific and colloquial usages. They are sometimes known as poison claws or jaw legs, referencing their evolution from maxillipeds, a term which they are also sometimes known by in the context of centipedes (maxillipeds, maxillipedes). Other names include toxicognaths (from toxic + the Greek gnathos, jaw), prehensors, telopodites, and forcipulae (singular forcipula). The term forcipule references their similarity with forceps.

Anatomy, systematics, and variation 

Forcipules evolved from the maxillipeds, meaning the front legs of an arthropod, of centipedes' last common ancestor, believed to be somewhat Scutigeromorph-like. They were initially leg-like, then progressed into a more pincer or claw-like shape, as seen today, and restricted to horizontal movement. The forcipules of modern Scutigeromorphs are the most significantly different in shape: they are more leg-like, and cannot hold prey like they are used among other orders- they are used for envenomation only, making their use more comparable to a knife than a pincer.

References 

Myriapod anatomy